Alexander Petrovich Osminin (born November 19, 1981) is a Russian classical pianist who gives concerts throughout the world.

Biography 
Alexander Osminin was born in Moscow. From 1988 till 1997, he studied at the music school, but his interest in music and his musical ability became evident in 1986, at the age of five.  His first teacher was I. V. Antypko.  He graduated from the music school in 1997.

From 1997 till 2000, he studied at the Academic Music College (Tchaikovsky Academic Music College at the Moscow State Conservatory).

In 2005, Osminin graduated from the Moscow Conservatory, where he studied in the class of the eminent pianist Eliso Virsaladze, and he continued his education as a postgraduate student (2008) at the same Conservatory.

Repertoire 

His repertoire ranges from the earliest keyboard masters to contemporary composers: from Domenico Scarlatti and J.S. Bach to Stravinsky and Hindemith.

Central to his repertoire are the works of Mozart, Beethoven, Chopin, Schubert, Schumann, Brahms, Liszt, Mussorgsky, Tchaikovsky, Prokofiev and Rachmaninoff.

Recitals and activities 

He gives concerts throughout the world: in 2009 a tour of nine Italy's cities, consisting of more than ten performances. Some of the places he also has performed are United States, Japan, France, Austria, Sweden, Norway, Germany, Switzerland, Portugal, Romania and many towns of Russia:  Moscow, Saint-Petersburg, Krasnoyarsk, Perm, Tolyatti, Irkutsk, Arkhangelsk, Murmansk, just to name a few.

However, as Osminin once put it, "Out of all the foreign tours the most significant to me are my concerts at the Salle Cortot in Paris (2008, Recitals in Salle Cortot, Paris, France) and also a solo concert in one of the Gasteig Halls in Munich."

There have also been tours to the former countries of the Soviet Union – Ukraine, Georgia, Azerbaijan and Kazakhstan.

Orchestras and chamber music 

As a concerto soloist Osminin enjoys associations with many major orchestras. In 2005, 2006, 2007 he gave concerts in the Great Hall of the Moscow Conservatory with the New Russia Orchestra conducted by Yuri Bashmet.

Another important feature in his work is chamber music. Osminin often plays in different chamber ensembles, partnering with Natalia Gutman, Eliso Virsaladze, Alexander Buzlov, Andrey Baranov, Eugene Petrov, as well as many others.

He has been working with the viola player Fedor Belugin for many years. They have recorded a CD of compositions by  Franck, Schumann and Brahms.

Competitions 

There are some of the international competitions that Alexander Osminin has won or been a prize-winner in:

 2010, 1st prize, Sibiu, Romania. The Carl Filtsch Competition in Romania
 2008, 1st prize, Katrineholm, Sweden. The 5th Swedish International Duo competition  (together with F. Belugin) 
 2008, 1st prize, Pordenone, Italy. Luciano Gante International Piano Competitions
 2008, 6th prize, Moscow, Russia. The Sviatoslav Richter International Piano Competition 
 2007, Audience Prize, Semi-finalist, Sendai City, Japan. 3rd Sendai International Piano Competition
 2001, Semi-finalist, Tbilisi, Georgia.  2nd Tbilisi International Piano Competition, amongst others.

Festivals 

Besides competitions, Osminin has taken part in many international music festivals:

 Animato in Paris 
 Julita Festival in Sweden 
 Classical Music Festival in Porto (Portugal)
 S. Richter Music Festival in Tarusa, Kaluga region, Russia 
 Dedication to Oleg Kagan Festival in Moscow

References

External links
 Official Youtube channel
 Alexander Osminin on InstantEncore
 Alexander Osminin on ClassicalConnect
 Alexander Osminin on The Cliveland International piano Competition
 Alexander Osminin on The Richter International Piano competition
 Alexander Osminin on The Sendai International Music Competition
 Official website of the Moscow State Concervatory. Alexander Osminin 
 Carl Filtsch International Competition official website

Russian classical pianists
Male classical pianists
Living people
1981 births
Moscow Conservatory alumni
21st-century classical pianists
21st-century Russian male musicians